Broc Feeney (born 18 October 2002) is an Australian racing driver competing in the Repco Supercars Championship for Triple Eight Race Engineering. He inherited Jamie Whincup's No. 88 Holden ZB Commodore following Whincup's retirement from full-time driving.  

In 2021, he won the Dunlop Super2 Series with Triple Eight Race Engineering, driving the iconic number 888 VF Commodore.

Biography 

Feeney started karting in 2013 at the age of eleven. He won numerous state and national championships in his junior years. In 2018, he moved up and competed in the Toyota 86 Racing Series Australia. In his debut year, Feeney went on to score two race wins and three podium finishes and was the youngest race winner at the age of fifteen. For 2019, he moved on the Kumho Tyre Super3 Series with Paul Morris Motorsport and was crowned series champion on his debut year. In 2020, Feeney replaced Jake Camilleri at MARC Cars Australia for the Bathurst 12 Hour after Camilleri was unable to compete due to business requirements. He went on to finish fifteenth outright with a win in class.

Feeney won the Dunlop Super2 Series in his second campaign, following his move from Tickford Racing to Triple Eight Race Engineering.  He was rewarded a drive with the highly successful Supercars team, Red Bull Ampol Racing, taking the place of the retiring Jamie Whincup.

During the 2022 Supercars Championship season, Feeney secured points in 23 out of the 24 races with a singular retirement in Race 2 of the 2022 Gold Coast 500. His first podium in the Supercars Championship came in the second race of the 2022 Tasmania SuperSprint finishing in 2nd position behind his teammate Shane Van Gisbergen. He then secured a P3 finish in the 3rd race of the 2022 Sandown SuperSprint. In Supercars's return to Adelaide for the final race of the season, Broc Feeney held off Chaz Mostert to take the win in Race 2 of the 2022 Adelaide 500. This made him the last and final winner for a Holden racing driver in the Supercars Championship following Holden's departure from the sport in 2022.

Career results

Bathurst 12 Hour results

Complete Super2 Series results
(key) (Race results only)

Supercars Championship results
(key) (Races in bold indicate pole position) (Races in italics indicate fastest lap)

Complete Bathurst 1000 results

References

External links
 

Australian racing drivers
2002 births
Living people
Supercars Championship drivers
Australian Endurance Championship drivers